Mary Ann Brown Newcomb, also known as Mary A. Newcomb, (January 5, 1817–December 23, 1892 was a camp and hospital nurse who served the Union Army during the American Civil War. She wrote the book Four Years of Work and Personal Experience in the War. When the war broke out her husband and son enlisted in the Union Army. Newcomb paid for her way to Fort Donelson following the Battle of Fort Donelson (1862) and found both men wounded and she cared for them. 

She had no experience caring for wounded soldiers, but like other Civil War nurses, Newcomb relinquished her everyday responsibilities to serve as a hard-working nurse. Her husband, First Sergeant Hiram A.W. Newcomb (born July 25, 1811) was wounded on February 15, 1862 and died eleven days later.

When no doctor was available, she amputated a finger, which was unusual among nurses. If soldiers needed care, she ignored the chief surgeons command for lights out at 9:00 p.m., and she provided necessary care for the soldiers. This was partly because she was a volunteer nurse, and did not report up the military chain-of-command. She provided care for her son, who healed and returned to active service, and her severely wounded husband who wished that she care for "the boys" with the 11th Illinois Infantry Regiment.

Mary Ann Brown was born on January 5, 1817 in Cayuga County, New York, she was the daughter of Mary Lockwood and Russell Brown. She died at her home in Effingham, Illinois on December 23, 1892. She is buried at Oakridge Cemetery in Effingham, Illinois.

Notes

References

Further reading
 

1817 births
1892 deaths
American Civil War nurses
People from Effingham, Illinois